Percival Edgar Deane  (10 August 1890–17 August 1946) was an Australian public servant.

Deane was born in Port Melbourne, the son of a carpenter. He won a scholarship to University High School, Melbourne, and then worked as a typewriter salesman, shorthand writer, and clerk at the University of Melbourne, before going into business, becoming part-owner of two companies, and founding and editing Australian Golfer (being an outstanding golfer himself).

On the outbreak of the First World War in 1914 he enlisted in the Australian Imperial Force and was posted to the 1st Australian General Hospital in Egypt, where he was commissioned Lieutenant and Quartermaster. In April 1916 he was invalided back to Australia suffering from overstrain.

In November 1916 Deane was appointed private secretary to Prime Minister Billy Hughes. He was secretary to the Australian delegation to the Versailles Conference, for which he was appointed Companion of the Order of St Michael and St George (CMG) in the 1920 New Year Honours, and to the Australian delegations to the Imperial Conferences of 1921 and 1926. His relationship with Hughes was dramatised in the 1974 ABC docudrama Billy and Percy, which won "Best Dramatised Documentary" at the 1975 Logies and the "Golden Reel" prize at the 1974–75 Australian Film Institute Awards.

In February 1921 he was appointed Secretary of the Prime Minister's Department and in 1929 Secretary of the Department of Home Affairs until its abolition in 1932. From 1932 until his retirement on medical grounds (with myocarditis) in 1936, he was a member of the War Pensions Entitlement Appeals Tribunal.

In his retirement, Deane broke his hip in a street-fall and became bedridden, eventually dying of cancer on 17 August 1946 at the age of 56.

Footnotes

References and further reading

1890 births
1946 deaths
Australian public servants
Public servants from Melbourne
Australian military personnel of World War I
Australian publishers (people)
Australian Army soldiers
Australian Army officers
Australian Companions of the Order of St Michael and St George
Deaths from cancer in Victoria (Australia)
Secretaries of the Department of the Prime Minister and Cabinet
People educated at University High School, Melbourne
20th-century Australian public servants
Australian book and manuscript collectors
People from Port Melbourne
Military personnel from Melbourne